Little Traverse Township is a civil township of Emmet County in the U.S. state of Michigan.  The population was 2,380 at the 2010 census.

Communities
The community is served by a box-only post office with the ZIP Code 49722.

Geography

Demographics
As of the census of 2000, there were 2,426 people, 978 households, and 707 families residing in the township. The racial makeup of the township was 96.50% White, 0.12% African American, 1.85% Native American, 0.54% Asian, 0.04% Pacific Islander, 0.12% from other races, and 0.82% from two or more races. Hispanic or Latino of any race were 0.82% of the population.

There were 978 households, out of which 33.0% had children under the age of 18 living with them, 60.6% were married couples living together, 8.2% had a female householder with no husband present, and 27.7% were non-families. 22.7% of all households were made up of individuals, and 6.4% had someone living alone who was 65 years of age or older.  The average household size was 2.47 and the average family size was 2.89.

In the township the population was spread out, with 25.6% under the age of 18, 5.4% from 18 to 24, 28.2% from 25 to 44, 27.6% from 45 to 64, and 13.2% who were 65 years of age or older.  The median age was 40 years. For every 100 females, there were 97.2 males.  For every 100 females age 18 and over, there were 94.1 males.

The median income for a household in the township was $41,228, and the median income for a family was $47,788. Males had a median income of $36,066 versus $23,250 for females. The per capita income for the township was $20,830.  About 4.3% of families and 6.1% of the population were below the poverty line, including 8.4% of those under age 18 and 3.8% of those age 65 or over.

References

Townships in Emmet County, Michigan
Townships in Michigan
Michigan populated places on Lake Michigan